Naghi is a Romanian language transliteration of the Hungarian surname Nagy. Notable people with this surname include:

 Gheorghe Naghi (born 1932), Romanian film director
George Naghi (1952-2011), Romanian businessman
 Gabriel Naghi (born 1962), Romanian general, director of the Protection and Guard Service from 2000 to 2005
 Iosif Naghi (1946-2018), Romanian athlete
 Liviu Naghi, Romanian basketball player

Romanian-language surnames